Jérémy Monnier (born 5 May 1989) is a French sports shooter. He placed 26th in the 10 metre air rifle event at the 2012 Summer Olympics. At the 2016 Rio Games he finished 39th and 38th in the 50 m rifle prone and 10 m air rifle events respectively.

Monnier took up shooting in 1997, and in 2004 was included to the national team.

References

External links

 

1989 births
Living people
French male sport shooters
Olympic shooters of France
Shooters at the 2012 Summer Olympics
Shooters at the 2016 Summer Olympics
People from Pontarlier
Sportspeople from Doubs
21st-century French people